The Tor Formation is a geological formation of late Campanian to Maastrichtian (uppermost Cretaceous) age. It forms the part of the Chalk Group in the North Sea. It is an important reservoir for oil and gas in fields such as Valhall. It overlies the Hod Formation. It underlies the Ekofisk Formation with local evidence of unconformity.

References

Geology of the North Sea